Tony Scales  (born June 13, 1983), professionally known as Chef Tone, is an American record producer and songwriter. Collaborating artists include Justin Bieber, Jamie Foxx, Dr. Dre, Trey Songz, Jacquees, Drake, Queen Naija, Sean Paul, among others. Chef Tone received his first Grammy nomination for Best Contemporary R&B Album for his contribution to the 2009 Trey Songz album Ready. He then went on to receive his second Grammy nomination for Best Reggae Album for his contribution to the 2015 Sean Paul album Full Frequency.

Career

In 2007, Chef, from Chicago, Illinois, linked with an entertainment manager and moved to Atlanta, Georgia. Within six months of relocating, Chef was offered an exclusive producer songwriter deal with Atlantic Records, the first by this label. As a songwriter, Chef Tone's first placement was with the Atlantic Records artist Plies for "Please Excuse My Hands," featuring Jamie Foxx. The song went on to climb to a top 10 position on music charts, which led to Chef's long-term deal to write, produce, and develop talent with Atlantic Records funding.  Lyor Cohen, North American Chairman and CEO of Warner Music Group, specifically constructed the deal to mimic the success of the Motown-era with Chef Tone at the helm. Chef Tone's manager at the time submitted several songs to Craig Kallman, Chairman and CEO of Atlantic Records, who then passed them on to Mike Caren, Executive Vice President of A&R for Atlantic Records. Caren immediately sent Chef Tone to LA for a meeting, offered him a deal, and matched him with R&B recording artist Trey Songz. This match yielded the first #1 record for Trey Songz with "Invented Sex" featuring Drake on the multi-platinum certified (RIAA) Ready album, which debuted at #3 on the Billboard 200 and peaked at #2 on the Top R&B/Hip Hop albums chart. Chef Tone also penned the singles "Bottoms Up," "Love Faces," "Say Aah," "Yo Side of the Bed," and "LOL :-)," which he wrote and produced, along with several more album tracks.

Chef's production success with Plies, The-Dream, Jamie Foxx, and Trey Songz garnered a mentorship with Dr. Dre and a collaboration on the 50 Cent's Animal Ambition album. Chef's placements began to stack up with numerous recording artists, including: Ludacris' "Sex Room," Jamie Foxx's "Best Night of My Life" and "Gorgeous," Flo Rida's "Respirator,"  Sean Paul's "Entertainment" featuring Juicy J, Nicki Minaj and 2 Chainz, Maejor Ali's "Lolly" featuring Justin Bieber & Juicy J, and much more. Bieber's "Heartbreaker" topped the iTunes charts at #1 in 63 countries, and peaking at #13 on US Hot 100 chart becoming Chef's fastest rising release. Bieber's album Journals was officially released on December 23, 2013, by Island Records. It was available as a digital exclusive through online platforms such as iTunes.[1][2] Prior to its official release, one new song was released every Monday night from October 7, 2013, to December 9, 2013, as part of a ten-week digital download campaign called Music Mondays.

Chef Tone first earned his nickname on the basketball court, where he served good passes, also known as "dishes," to his teammates, his name carries through to his career in the music industry. His newest venture with Interscope A&R President, Aaron Bay-Schuck, and Aye Girl Music Group, keeps Chef Tone busy curating an impressive roster of writers, producers, and artists.

Discography
Songwriting and production credits

References

External links
 Chef Tone, writing and winning
 Chef Tone racking up hits with authority

1983 births
Living people
African-American record producers
American hip hop record producers
American rhythm and blues keyboardists
Midwest hip hop musicians
Musicians from Chicago
Songwriters from Illinois
African-American songwriters
Record producers from Illinois
21st-century African-American people
20th-century African-American people